Ali Azertekin (1905, Baku - 1967, Istanbul)  was an Azerbaijani teacher, publicist, public figure of the Azerbaijani émigrée.

Life 
Ali Azertekin was born in 1905 in Baku in the family of Iskander Taghizade. His mother was a close relative of the poet Samed Mansur Kazimzade. Ali Azertekin was educated at the Pedagogical University of Baku. After graduating, he worked in Ganja and became a member of the secret Musavat party. In 1928, Azertekin left for Iran because of the persecution of members of the Musavat party. While in Tabriz, he contacts Mahammad Ali Rasulzade, who was in Tehran at that time, and through him met with Shevket Esendal, the former Turkish ambassador to Azerbaijan, who helps him left for Istanbul.

In Istanbul, Ali Azertekin received a philological education. In 1933, at the suggestion of Mirzabala Mahammadzade, Mahammad Amin Rasulzade invited Azertekin to Warsaw, where he took up journalism. Ali Azertekin worked for the Istiqlal, Azerbaijan and the Kurtulush magazines, which were published by Musavat. In 1936, he also participated in the conference of the Musavat party in Warsaw. With the outbreak of World War II, Ali Azertekin left for Tehran. There he met Ezhder Kurtulan, with whom he left for Isfahan at the risk of being arrested by the Red Army. He was arrested during Ali Soheili's government, close to the Soviet Union, and remained in custody until the end of the war. Until 1956 he lived in Iran, then returned to Istanbul. Ali Azertekin died on October 20, 1967, at 20:00 in the Istanbul district of Haydarpasha. After a funeral prayer in the Osmanaga mosque, on October 21 he was buried in the Karajaahmed cemetery, not far from the grave of Mirzabala Mahammadzade.

See also 
 Mahammad Amin Rasulzade

References 

People from Baku
1905 births
1967 deaths
Azerbaijani emigrants to Turkey
Azerbaijani publicists
Azerbaijani emigrants